State Route 77 (SR 77), is an east–west state highway in the U.S. state of Tennessee. The  route traverses the flat farmland of West Tennessee.

Route description

Dyer County

SR 77 begins as a secondary 2-lane highway in Dyer County at an interchange with US 51/SR 3 (Future I-69) in Newbern. It travels along the northern edge of town before having an intersection with SR 211 (Old US 51), just northeast of downtown, before leaving Newbern and continuing east through farmland and rural areas to  cross into Gibson County.

Gibson County

SR 77 passes through Yorkville, where it has an intersection with SR 188 before passing through the community of Hopewell to enter Dyer. SR 77 then has an interchange with US 45W (SR 5), which it becomes concurrent with, while the road continues east into downtown as SR 185. They go southeast as a 4-lane divided highway to leave Dyer and enter Trenton, where they have an intersection with SR 367 (Old US 45W). The highway then narrows to 2-lanes as it bypasses Trenton on its eastern side, where SR 54 joins the concurrency. They then cross a bridge over the North Fork of the Forked Deer River and come to an intersection with SR 104, where SR 77 leaves US 45W/SR 5/SR 54 to have an unsigned concurrency with SR 104, with SR 77 being the one that is signed. SR 77, becoming a primary route at this point, continues eastward to pass by the Gibson County Airport before entering Milan. The highway passes through neighborhoods before entering downtown along N Main Street before turning left onto Front Street to come to an intersection with US 45E (SR 43), where they become concurrent with that highway and SR 77 becomes unsigned. They go south along S 1st Street, a 4-lane undivided highway, though downtown before coming to an intersection with US 79/US 70A (SR 76/Van Hook Street). SR 77 then leaves US 45E/SR 43/SR 104 and follows US 79/US 70A. They pass through a neighborhood before having an intersection with SR 425 (Middle Road) before leaving Milan and widening to a divided highway for a short distance before narrowing to 2-lanes and crossing into Carroll County.

Carroll County

US 79/US 70A/SR 76/SR 77 immediately enter Atwood and has an intersection with SR 220. They then come a Y-Intersection, where US 70A departs from US 79/SR 76, and SR 77 follows US 70A as its companion as a hidden, or secret designation. US 70A/SR 77 goes east to have an intersection with SR 220A before they leave Atwood and pass through rural areas before passing through McLemoresville, where they have an intersection with SR 105. US 70A/SR 77 then have an intersection with SR 436 before entering Huntingdon. They then come to an intersection with the Huntingdon Bypass (SR 22), where they turn north to become concurrent with it. They then turn east and have an intersection with SR 22 Business, where SR 22 splits off and goes north. This section of SR 22 is signed as a bypass route of SR 22, even it is the main route of SR 22. US 70A/SR 77 go east along the northern edge of the city before SR 77 splits off and goes north while US 70A continues east along SR 364. SR 77 reverts into a signed secondary route, becoming a north–south route for the remainder of its course. SR 77 then leaves Huntingdon as a 2-lane highway and has intersections with SR 219 and SR 423 before crossing into Henry County.

Henry County

SR 77 then has an intersection  with SR 114 at a Y-Intersection before passing through rural areas to enter Paris at an intersection with SR 218 (Paris Bypass). The highway then enters a business district before coming to an intersection with, where it reaches the northern terminus, US 641 (SR 69) on the southeast side of the city.

Major intersections

See also

References
Official Tennessee Highway Maps

External links
Tennessee Department of Transportation

077
077
077
077
077